In grammar, the ergative case (abbreviated ) is the grammatical case that identifies a nominal phrase  as the agent of a transitive verb in ergative–absolutive languages.

Characteristics
In such languages, the ergative case is typically marked (most salient), while the absolutive case is unmarked. Recent work in case theory has vigorously supported the idea that the ergative case identifies the agent (the intentful performer of an action) of a verb (Woolford 2004).

In Kalaallisut (Greenlandic) for example, the ergative case is used to mark subjects of transitive verbs and possessors of nouns. This syncretism with the genitive is commonly referred to as the relative case.

Nez Perce has a three-way nominal case system with both ergative (-nim) and accusative (-ne) plus an absolute (unmarked) case for intransitive subjects: hipáayna qíiwn ‘the old man arrived’; hipáayna wewúkiye ‘the elk arrived’; wewúkiyene péexne qíiwnim ‘the old man saw an elk’.

Sahaptin has an ergative noun case (with suffix -nɨm) that is limited to transitive constructions only when the direct object is 1st or 2nd person: iwapáatayaaš łmámanɨm ‘the old woman helped me’; paanáy iwapáataya łmáma ‘the old woman helped him/her’ (direct); páwapaataya łmámayin ‘the old woman helped him/her’ (inverse).

Other languages that use the ergative case are Georgian, Chechen, and other Caucasian languages, Mayan languages, Mixe–Zoque languages, Wagiman and other Australian Aboriginal languages as well as Basque, Burushaski and Tibetan. Among all Indo-European languages only, Yaghnobi, Kurdish language varieties (including Kurmanji, Zazaki and Sorani) and Pashto from Iranian languages and Hindi/Urdu, along with some other Indo-Aryan languages are ergative.

The ergative case is also a feature of some constructed languages such as Na'vi, Ithkuil and Black Speech.

See also

 Antipassive voice
 Ergative-absolutive language
 Morphosyntactic alignment
 Volition (linguistics)

Citations

References
Haspelmath, Martin. 2022. Ergative, absolutive, accusative and nominative as comparative concepts. In Iomdin, Leonid & Milićević, Jasmina & Polguère, Alain (eds.), Lifetime linguistic inspirations: To Igor Mel’čuk, 201–213. Frankfurt: Peter Lang. (doi:10.5281/zenodo.7625026) (https://zenodo.org/record/7625026) 

 Woolford, Ellen. "Lexical Case, Inherent Case, and Argument Structure". Feb 2005.

 "Glossary of linguistic terms by Eugene E. Loos. 2003

Grammatical cases